Nukitsamees is a 1981 Estonian musical film directed by Helle Karis and based on the 1920 novel of the same name by Oskar Luts.

Awards, nominations, participations:
 1982: All-Union Film Festival (USSR), Grand Prix of children's jury and audience
 1983: Soviet Estonian Film Festival, best cinematographer work: Ago Ruus

Plot

Cast
Egert Soll	as Nukitsamees
Anna-Liisa Kurve as Iti
Ülari Kirsipuu as Kusti
Ines Aru as Mother
Aarne Üksküla as Father
Sulev Nõmmik as Grandfather
Ita Ever as Metsamoor
Kaarel Kilvet as Metsavana
Urmas Kibuspuu as Tölpa
Tõnu Kark as Mõhk
Mari Jüssi as Minni
Tanel Kapper as Juku
Ingrid Maasik as Mann
Heiki Moorlat as Aadu
Mihkel Raud as Tõnn

References

External links
 
 Nukitsamees, entry in Estonian Film Database (EFIS)

1981 films
Estonian musical films
Estonian-language films
Films based on works by Estonian writers
1980s musical films